Donn Moomaw (born October 15, 1931) is an American retired professional football player and Presbyterian minister.

Moomaw played college football for the UCLA Bruins as the center and linebacker for the team. He was elected to the College Football Hall of Fame in 1973.

Early life
Moomaw was born in Santa Ana, California, and attended its Santa Ana High School.

Football career

Moomaw played linebacker in 1950, 1951, and 1952. During that time, he was named a two time All-American (in 1950 and consensus in 1952), making him the first in UCLA history. He was named MVP both in 1950 and 1952, and he was co-captain in 1952.

In 1953, Moomaw was selected in the first round of the NFL draft by the Los Angeles Rams. However, he did not play in the NFL, noting that he did not want to play football on Sundays. Moomaw signed with the Toronto Argonauts of the Canadian Football League, whose teams did not play on Sundays. He appeared in seven games for the Argonauts in 1953, and two games for the Ottawa Rough Riders in 1955.

Moomaw's UCLA jersey number (#80) has been retired by the team. He was inducted into the College Football Hall of Fame in 1973, and the UCLA Athletics Hall of Fame in its inaugural year of 1984. His football legacy at UCLA continues through the "Donn D. Moomaw Award for Outstanding Defensive Player in USC Game", which is still given today.

Minister career
Moomaw later became a Presbyterian minister, most notably serving Los Angeles' Bel Air Presbyterian Church as pastor from 1964 to 1993.  During this time, he became friends with California Governor Ronald Reagan and wife Nancy.  Moomaw gave the invocation at Reagan's inauguration as governor of California in both 1967 and 1971 and later at his 1981 presidential inauguration and 1985 presidential inauguration. His invocation at the 1981 inauguration included a prayer for freedom for 52 Americans.

Sex scandal

In 1993, he was forced to resign as a result of "sexual contact" with five women. In 1997, he was allowed to return to the pulpit on a full-time basis at the 800-member Village Community Presbyterian Church in Rancho Santa Fe.  Prior to that position, Rev. Moomaw was allowed to serve as the guest preacher at St. Andrew's Presbyterian Church.

References

1931 births
Living people
All-American college football players
Sportspeople from Santa Ana, California
Players of American football from California
American football centers
UCLA Bruins football players
American players of Canadian football
College Football Hall of Fame inductees
American Presbyterians
Toronto Argonauts players
Ottawa Rough Riders players